Xinjie may refer to:
New Territories, Hong Kong
Xinjie Town, Jiayu County, Hubei
Xinjie Town, Sui County, Hubei
Xinjie Town, Ejin Horo Banner, Ordos Prefecture, Inner Mongolia; location of the Mausoleum of Genghis Khan
Xinjie Township, Yuanyang County, Yunnan
Xinjie Hui ethnic township, Guide County, Qinghai
Xinjie Subdistrict, Yixing, Jiangsu
Xinjie Village, Fangyuan, Changhua County, Taiwan
Xinjie Village, Mingjian, Nantou County, Taiwan
Xinjie Village, Beigang, Yunlin County, Taiwan

People with the name
Huang Hsin-chieh (1928–1999), Taiwanese politician
Angelica Lee (born 1976), Malaysian singer
Ji Xinjie (born 1997), Chinese swimmer